Chris Rhodes is a trombone player from New Haven, Connecticut best known for playing trombone in several notable ska bands including Spring Heeled Jack, the Mighty Mighty Bosstones, Bim Skala Bim and the Toasters as well as Connecticut funk band, Boogie Chillin'. He has also made frequent on-stage guest appearances with bands such as Reel Big Fish, NOFX and Less Than Jake.

He was once a student at the University of Connecticut in Storrs, Connecticut where he played trombone in the marching band.

In 2007, the Mighty Mighty Bosstones reunited after a four year hiatus. The band continued to record and perform live for the next fifteen years until its dissolution in January 2022. Since then, Rhodes has returned to performing with Spring Heeled Jack and the Toasters.

External links
Official website of The Mighty Mighty Bosstones

Year of birth missing (living people)
Living people
American ska trombonists
Male trombonists
African-American rock musicians
Western Connecticut State University alumni
Musicians from New Haven, Connecticut
The Mighty Mighty Bosstones members
21st-century trombonists
21st-century American male musicians
21st-century African-American musicians